Streptomyces lavenduligriseus is a bacterium species from the genus of Streptomyces. Streptomyces lavenduligriseus produces Pentenomycin II, Pentenomycin III and narangomyci.

See also 
 List of Streptomyces species

References

Further reading

External links
Type strain of Streptomyces lavenduligriseus at BacDive -  the Bacterial Diversity Metadatabase

lavenduligriseus
Bacteria described in 1991